The 1948 season was the thirty-seventh season for Santos FC.

References

External links
Official Site 

Santos
1948
1948 in Brazilian football